The rough frog is a burrowing frog native to New South Wales and Queensland, Australia.

Rough frog may also refer to:

 Rough horned frog, a frog endemic to northern Borneo
 Rough leaf frog, a genus of tree frogs
 Rough rain frog, a frog found in Eswatini, Lesotho and South Africa
 Rough ridged frog, a frog found in Angola, Zambia, and possibly the Democratic Republic of the Congo
 Rough sand frog, a frog found in Angola, the Democratic Republic of the Congo, Namibia, Tanzania, Zambia, and Zimbabwe, and possibly Malawi and Mozambique

See also

 Rough-armed frog
 Rough-back frog
 Rough-sided frog
 Rough-skinned frog (disambiguation)

Animal common name disambiguation pages